Quainton (formerly Quainton Malet) is a village and civil parish in Buckinghamshire, England,  north-west of Aylesbury. The population of the civil parish at the 2011 Census was 1,295. The village has two churches (Anglican and Baptist), a school and one public house. The location means that while many commute to London, others are employed in neighbouring towns and villages.

Its name is Old English and means Queen's Estate (cwen tun).  It is not known to which queen this refers, but possibly the Queen was Edith, the wife of Edward the Confessor.  Known as "Fair Edith" she held manors in this part of Buckinghamshire, including a hunting lodge at Mentmore.  Edward the Confessor had a palace at nearby Brill.

The former suffix Malet refers to the Malet family who were lords of the manor from 1066 until about 1348.  At least one member went on the crusades, and had associations with the Hospitallers, the organization credited with rebuilding Quainton church circa 1340.  The Hospitallers erected the cross on the village green, the base and shaft of which still remain.

The village green in the centre of the village has grouped around it some of the half-timbered thatched cottages for which the village is known.

The parish church is dedicated to St Mary and the Holy Cross.  It is a 14th-century building of the style of gothic architecture known as Decorated.  The west tower was built later in the 15th century.  The church contains many memorial brasses and sculpture, including the 1689 tomb of Sir Richard Winwood carved by Thomas Stayner.  The stone effigies depict the deceased lying in full armour, while his widow, Ann, who paid for the tomb, rests beside him, half sitting regarding her husband. In the chancel are a reredos and sedilia by William White who was responsible for the heavy Victorian restoration and rebuilding of the chancel in 1877.  The church also contains Victorian stained glass windows. Richard Brett, a former rector of Quainton and one of the translators of the King James Version of the Bible, is buried in the chancel.

Close by the church is the former rectory, a large house described by Pevsner as of vitreous red brick.  The principal facade has a three–bayed centre and two canted bays.  The house contains 16th-century linenfold panelling.

The Winwood Almshouses, still inhabited, were built to house the poor, their gothic style of architecture belying the construction date of 1687. They are a terrace of eight small cottages, one storey high with a row of dormers in the attics.  These attic windows have alternating small and large gables.  The terrace is decorated by two porches, with a plaque above.  The almshouses are further adorned by diagonally placed chimney stacks.

One of the most visible buildings is the 70 ft high Quainton Windmill, built in 1830–32. Derelict for the greater part of the 20th century it was restored in 1997 and can grind wheat into flour. Further restoration continues.

The local headquarters for the RSPCA are in the parish, outside the village.

Quainton has a mix of old and new dwellings.

Located just out from Quainton beyond the church is what was, at one point, one of the largest beef cattle farms in Buckinghamshire, Denham Farm. This ceased being a going farm towards the end of 1990's and it is now a house.

Education
Quainton Church of England Combined School is a mixed Church of England primary school. It is a voluntary controlled school, which takes children from 4 to 11. The school currently has around 185 pupils.

Transport
Rail
Quainton's nearest National Rail station is Aylesbury Vale Parkway, about 5 miles away. Quainton was once linked to London by train from Quainton Road station to Marylebone and Baker Street; in the opposite direction travel was available to Rugby, Verney Junction and elsewhere.  Passenger services ceased in 1963, but trains from Aylesbury run to connect with events at the Buckinghamshire Railway Centre at Quainton Road station on some Bank Holidays. The station was also once a junction for the light railway (closed in 1936), sometimes known as the Brill Tramway, connecting Quainton with Brill.

Buses
Quainton is served by Arriva's 16 service between Aylesbury and Steeple Claydon via Aylesbury Vale Parkway station. There are nine buses daily in each direction on Mondays to Fridays and a reduced service on Saturdays.

Notable people
 Hilda Mary Woods MBE (1892–1971),  statistician
 Joseph Mayett, 1783–1839, Autobiography, Joseph Mayett of Quainton
 Ruth Goodman (1963-) (historian and television presenter)
 Mark Smith (1965-), The Man in Seat Sixty-One

References

External links 

Quainton village website
Ofsted Report for Quainton CoE Combined School
DfES Performance Tables for Quainton CoE Combined School
British History Online http://www.british-history.ac.uk/rchme/bucks/vol2/pp240-248
Vision of Britain http://www.visionofbritain.org.uk/place/3711
The essential Francis Frith link https://www.francisfrith.com/uk/quainton

Aylesbury Vale
Civil parishes in Buckinghamshire
Villages in Buckinghamshire